Wilfried Sarr (born 16 June 1996) is a German footballer who plays as a defender for SpVg Schonnebeck in the Oberliga Niederrhein. He is the younger brother of Marian Sarr.

Career

TuS Ennepetal
On 15 October 2019 TuS Ennepetal confirmed, that they had signed Sarr.

References

External links
 
 Wilfried Sarr at FuPa

1996 births
Living people
German footballers
Germany youth international footballers
German people of Gambian descent
German sportspeople of African descent
Association football defenders
Borussia Mönchengladbach II players
1. FC Kaiserslautern II players
FC Rot-Weiß Erfurt players
TSV Steinbach Haiger players
Regionalliga players
3. Liga players
Footballers from Essen